KBL may refer to:

 Kumari Bank Limited, a commercial bank of Nepal
 Kabul International Airport, IATA airport code for the airport in Kabul, Afghanistan
 Karnataka Bank Limited
 Kirloskar Brothers Limited, a leading Pump manufacturer of India
 KBL, a cable/DBS channel in Pittsburgh, Pennsylvania, now known as AT&T SportsNet Pittsburgh
 KBL European Private Bankers, one of Europe's largest onshore private banking groups, headquartered in Luxembourg
 Kikki, Bettan & Lotta, a Swedish-Norwegian super trio, active 2001-2004 and consisting Kikki Danielsson, Elisabeth "Bettan" Andreassen and Lotta Engberg
 Kilusang Bagong Lipunan, a political party in the Philippines
 Korean Basketball League, the professional men's basketball league in South Korea
 Kotha Bangaru Lokam, a 2008 Telugu film
 Glycine C-acetyltransferase, an enzyme
 Kadyos, baboy, kag langka, a stew made from pigeon peas, pork, and jackfruit from the Philippines